Gohardu (also known as Gohardū) is a village in Bemani Rural District, Byaban District, Minab County, Hormozgan Province, Iran. At the 2006 census, its population was 1,555, in 250 families.

References 

Populated places in Minab County